Dr. Manda Jagannath (born 22 May 1951) is an Indian politician, was a member of the 11th, 13th, 14th & 15th Lok Sabha of India representing Nagarkurnool constituency. He belongs to Telangana Rashtra Samithi party.

Early life
Manda Jagannadham was born in Mahbubnagar district, Telangana. He holds a bachelor's degree in medicine. He did his MBBS from Osmania University.

Career
After graduating with a medicine degree he worked as a doctor in Mahbubnagar and Hyderabad.

Political career
He was one among the 5 members representing Telugu Desam Party in Lok Sabha, and a member of the party's Polit Bureau, its decision-making body . He was expelled from Telugu Desam for taking bribe from Congress and voted against Telugu Desam Party. He was expelled & disqualified from Lok Sabha by speaker Somnath Chatterjee for voting against party's WHIP.  He represents the Nagarkurnool constituency of Andhra Pradesh.

He switched to the Indian National Congress party during the No Confidence Motion. He was reelected in 2009. On 29 December 2008 Mr Jagannath appointed as Andhra Pradesh govt's special representative in New Delhi.

TRS Party
He joined in TRS party at the peak of Telangana agitation.

References

External links
 Palamoor NRI Forum PALAMOOR NRI FORUM
 Official biographical sketch in Parliament of India website

Manda Jagannath was in news, for slapping AP Grameena Vikas Bank manager in Mahabubnagar district on 2 July 2009.
 

People from Telangana
Telangana politicians
India MPs 1996–1997
India MPs 1999–2004
India MPs 2004–2009
Telugu politicians
India MPs 2009–2014
1951 births
Living people
Telugu Desam Party politicians
Indian National Congress politicians
Telangana Rashtra Samithi politicians
Lok Sabha members from Andhra Pradesh
People from Nagarkurnool district
Osmania University alumni
Indian National Congress politicians from Andhra Pradesh